En tu cabeza is a 2016 Spanish sci fi film directed by Daniel Sánchez Arévalo, Borja Cobeaga, Kike Maíllo and Alberto Ruiz Rojo. The film is produced by the Spanish natural gas utilities company Gas Fenosa.

Plot
The film is divided into four vignettes linked by the following plot: Year 2052. Andrea's job is to travel back in time and her mission is to go deep into our heads and make us see the importance of preserving the environment. The young woman tries to change the destiny of the planet, but also wants to change her own way. To do this, he tries to prevent his self from the past from making the mistakes he now regrets.

Cast

References

External links

2016 science fiction films
Spanish science fiction films
Environmental films
2010s Spanish-language films
2010s Spanish films
Films about time travel